Sir John Charles Bell, 1st Baronet (1843–1924) was a British businessman and Lord Mayor of London from 1907 to 1908.

Bell was elected a Sheriff of the City of London in 1901 (serving October 1901 to September 1902), together with Horace Brooks Marshall. He was Sheriff during the coronation year 1902, and was knighted in the 1902 Coronation Honours, receiving the accolade from King Edward VII at Buckingham Palace on 24 October that year. During his year as Sheriff, he also accompanied the Lord Mayor (Sir Joseph Dimsdale) on official visits to the English cities of Wolverhampton (July 1902), Bath and Exeter (September 1902).

Five years later, he was elected Lord Mayor of the City of London in 1907 (serving November 1907 to November 1908). For his service as Lord Mayor he was customary created a Baronet, of Framewood in the Parish of Stoke Poges in the County of Buckingham, on 18 July 1908. The title became extinct on his death in 1924.

References

1843 births
1924 deaths
Sheriffs of the City of London
20th-century lord mayors of London
20th-century English politicians
Baronets in the Baronetage of the United Kingdom